Endotricha sexpunctata is a species of snout moth in the genus Endotricha. It was described by Paul Ernest Sutton Whalley in 1963, and is known from Marianas Island.

References

Moths described in 1963
Endotrichini